Steven Howard Thompson (born 14 October 1978) is a Scottish former professional footballer, who played for Dundee United, Rangers, Cardiff City, Burnley and St Mirren. He was also a Scotland international between 2002 and 2004.

Club career

Dundee United
Born in Paisley, he started his career at Dundee United in 1996 and made his début as a substitute in a league match against Hearts in 1997. With United he won the SFL Youth League in 1997. By season 1998–1999 he had become a regular in the Dundee United team and in October 2002 began talks on a new contract, insisting a week later they were "going well". Amidst speculation that Rangers were interested in signing Thompson, talks resumed in mid-November, only for the move to Rangers to all but be confirmed before the end of the month. Following talks on a new contract broken down, it announced that Dundee United had placed Thompson on a transfer list.

Rangers
On Boxing Day 2002, Thompson moved to Rangers for £200,000 with Billy Dodds having returned to Tannadice twenty-four hours earlier, though Sky Sports reported the move was completed on 31 December 2002. Thompson scored on his debut in the 3–1 win over Dundee.

After suffering knee ligament damage in September 2003, Thompson missed most of the season, undergoing surgery which was successful and returning in March. Later in the 2003–04 season, Thompson would go on to score six goals in the remaining matches, which included a 2–1 loss in an Old Firm game on 28 March 2004.

Thompson played in the majority of matches the following season and despite having played in nearly every match of 2005–06, Thompson would score his first Champions League goal, in a 2–2 draw against Petržalka 1898, in Matchday Four, on 1 November 2005. Thompson's goals were usually accompanied by what appeared to be extreme anger as Thompson vented to all and sundry. By the end of December, Thompson was allowed to move to Cardiff City for a fee of £250,000 in January 2006. He was previously linked with a move to SPL rivals Aberdeen.

Cardiff City
During his first year at Ninian Park, he scored twice on his debut, on 14 January 2006, in a 3–0 win over Burnley. Since his debut, he was a regular first team member and spent the year forming a partnership with fellow striker Michael Chopra. He played a total of 45 games in both league and cup competitions during his first year but only managed to find the net 6 times. Thompson was transfer listed in the summer of 2007 due to his inability to score goals consistently at Championship level but a bizarre injury prevented him from leaving the club. Thompson was on holiday in the US when he fell off a banana boat, being towed behind another boat, which caused him to sustain a groin injury that required surgery. He returned from the injury on 15 September where he came off the bench to grab a late equaliser in a league match against Plymouth Argyle and continued to progress making his first start for Cardiff in five months in November. However, despite his increasing form he was not formally taken off the transfer list and attracted interest from Scottish Premier League side Aberdeen.

During November and the beginning of December, Thompson was first choice striker for the Bluebirds and normally lined up alongside Jimmy Floyd Hasselbaink in the squad and he found the net three times during this period, against Hull City, Colchester United and Blackpool. After these matches Thompson held an interview with Scottish newspaper The Herald in which he claimed that manager Dave Jones had made him a scapegoat for Cardiff's failure to reach the play-offs the previous year. During the interview he also revealed that he and Jones rarely speak to each other any more after he was placed on the transfer list. A day later on 15 December he was sent off in a derby match against Bristol City after a foul on Bristol goalkeeper Adriano Basso by referee Uriah Rennie, who was heavily criticised by Dave Jones for his handling of the game.

On 14 January 2008, Cardiff manager Dave Jones revealed that the club had received two offers for Thompson from another Football League Championship club, but they had been turned down. In the 2008–09 season, Thompson played four times for Cardiff City, including his first goal of the season, in a 2–1 win over Southampton on the opening game of the season.

Burnley
On 1 September 2008, after spending over a year on the transfer list at Cardiff, he signed for Burnley on a two-year deal linking up with manager Owen Coyle again, during Coyle's time at Dundee United Thompson used to clean his football boots. He made his Burnley debut on 13 September against Nottingham Forest and went on to make over 40 appearances for the side during the season scoring a career high total of 11 goals, including a 20-yard volley on 12 May in the 2–0 win over Reading in the second leg of the Championship play-off semi-final. His form led manager Owen Coyle to label him "the best free transfer of the season".

In the 2009–10 season, with Burnley now in the Premier League for the first time in 33 years, Thompson's opportunities were mainly limited to cameo roles. Following Coyle's departure to rival Bolton and was replaced by Brian Laws, He scored his first Premier League goal for Burnley in a 2–1 defeat by Wolves on 13 March 2010. Despite Burnley being relegated, Thompson went on to score three goals in the remaining matches, against Sunderland, Birmingham City and Tottenham Hotspur. Thompson was offered a new one year-contract by Burnley, which he accepted.

In the 2010–11 season, with Burnley back in the Championship after one season in the Premier League, Thompson again saw his opportunities limited. Thompson would score an equaliser against his former club, Cardiff City, in a 1–1 draw. Thompson said after the match: "It's important we kept up our momentum, going into these two bigs games at Watford and Cardiff, and taking four out of six points is a good return, on the back of our win against Norwich before that. We're building momentum and looking forward. This is the first time certainly I've felt we're really picking up a bit of speed here." After the 2010–11 season, Thompson was released by the club. Following his release, Thompson announced he would return to Scotland for the first time since leaving Rangers for Cardiff City. In addition, Thompson stated he enjoyed playing for the club.

St Mirren
Steven Thompson signed a two-year deal with boyhood heroes St Mirren on 1 June 2011. After the move, Thompson says his main objective at the club is to aim for to climb the SPL table.

He made his home debut at St Mirren Park against Morton in the Renfrewshire Cup match, which St Mirren won 4–2. Thompson scored two goals in the match. Thompson won, and then missed, a penalty kick on his debut against Dunfermline Athletic on the opening game of the season. After the match, Boss Danny Lennon believes Thompson should remain as a penalty taker. On 6 August 2011, Thompson would score his first goal for the club, in a 1–1 draw against former club, Dundee United. Three weeks later, on 23 August 2011, Thompson scored twice, in the second round of Scottish League Cup, in a 4–3 win over Morton. He ended his eight games without scoring, on 15 October 2011, when he scored against his former club, Rangers, as both sides drew 1–1. After the match, Thompson says scoring against his former side at Ibrox stadium is "brilliant" and a "great feeling" to equalise. Thompson since a regular first team member and scoring form shortly became very slow. Thompson then scored his first hat-trick for St Mirren against Dunfermline Athletic in April 2012 to take his tally for the season to 15. After the match, Thompson spoke about his hat-trick and revealed he hadn't scored a hat-trick over a decade ago.

In the 2012–13 season, Thompson starts his season when he scored his first goal of the season, in a 2–1 loss against Hibernian on 18 August 2012. Soon, that was followed up, on 29 September 2012, when he scored a brace, including an overhead kick and winning the penalty, allowing Lewis Guy to score, in a 5–4 thrilling victory against Ross County. From 21 December 2012 to 30 December 2012, Thompson scored four goals in three consecutive matches. Thompson scored in a 3–2 win over Celtic to send the club through to the final of the Scottish League Cup. In February 2013 he agreed a new one-year contract with St Mirren. He went on to score the second goal in a 3–2 victory against the Edinburgh team Heart of Midlothian which led to the Paisley team winning the League Cup Final. Following the win, Thompson described winning the Scottish League Cup as "bursting with pride" and amazing feeling.

Thompson scored his first goal of the 2013/14 season in a 1–1 draw against Aberdeen on 30 September 2013. He then followed up with a brace in a 3–0 win over Partick Thistle on 9 November 2013, and another came in the next game, as St Mirren win 2–1 over Ross County. Thompson would score another brace, in a 3–2 win over Motherwell on 5 April 2014, which relegated Hearts to the Scottish Championship and helped St Mirren stay in the Scottish Premiership for another season. Thompson finished the season on high, becoming the club's top-scorer, as well as finishing in eighth place. At the end of season 2013–14, Thompson was named as new club captain by new St Mirren manager Tommy Craig. The striker replaced Jim Goodwin in the role, as the Irishman took up a new player-coach role under Craig. Upon becoming captain, Thompson said being captain was an honor and it made him proud. He also intended to finish his career at St Mirren.

On 23 April 2015, at the club's Ralson Training Complex, Thompson threw a spiked pole at teammate John McGinn, after losing possession in a training session. The pole went a centimetre into McGinn's leg and tore the muscle, but did not do any long term damage; McGinn missed the remainder of the season due to this injury. Thompson apologised for the incident, describing it as a "prank."

Following Saints relegation from the Scottish Premiership, Thompson signed a new one-year deal with the club on 26 June 2015. Thompson retired at the end of the 2015/16 season, with his final appearance being a 2–2 draw with Rangers.

International career
Thompson has been capped for Scotland at under-21 level and won his first full Scotland cap against France in March 2002 and got his first start a month later, scoring his first goal in May 2002 against a Hong Kong League XI during the HKSAR Reunification Cup. He would score twice more for his country, in a 3–1 friendly win over Canada at Easter Road in October 2002 and equalizing in a 1–1 draw away to Moldova in a World Cup qualifier in October 2004.

Personal life

Thompson is a musician and in May 2008 he penned a song for Cardiff's FA Cup Final appearance. His dad, Graham, is also a musician and plays in a Glasgow pub band called Dr. Cook and the Boners. Following St Mirren winning the Scottish League Cup, Thompson revealed he wrote a song for the club, but decided against playing the song in public, even if the club win the Cup.

While growing up, Thompson attended Houston Primary School and Gryffe High School, as did his children.

Career statistics

Club

International

Scores and results list Scotland's goal tally first.

Honours

Club
Rangers
Scottish Premier League: 2002–03, 2004–05
Scottish Cup: 2002–03
Scottish League Cup: 2004–05

Burnley
Football League Championship play-offs: 2008–09

St Mirren
Scottish League Cup: 2012–13

References

External links

International stats at 11v11

1978 births
Living people
Scottish footballers
Scotland international footballers
Scotland under-21 international footballers
Association football forwards
Dundee United F.C. players
Rangers F.C. players
Cardiff City F.C. players
Burnley F.C. players
St Mirren F.C. players
Scottish Premier League players
English Football League players
Premier League players
Footballers from Paisley, Renfrewshire
Scottish Professional Football League players
FA Cup Final players
Scottish association football commentators